Legislative elections were held in France on 2 June 1946 to elect the second post-war Constituent Assembly designated to prepare a new constitution. The ballot system used was proportional representation.

After the liberation of France in the Second World War, three parties dominated the political scene due to their participation in the Resistance to the German occupation: the French Communist Party (PCF), the French Section of the Workers' International (SFIO, socialist party) and the Popular Republican Movement (MRP) Christian democratic party. They formed a provisional government led by General Charles de Gaulle.

General de Gaulle advocated a strong presidential government. He felt that the "regime of the parties" under the French Third Republic's system of parliamentary government (characterised by its political instability and ever-changing coalitions) was a cause of the 1940 collapse. However, the three main parties considered parliamentary democracy to be inseparable from the ideology of French republicanism. To them, de Gaulle's project appeared to be a rebirth of Bonapartism. In January 1946, de Gaulle resigned from the Cabinet.

The socialist Félix Gouin succeeded him. A first constitutional draft was approved by the National Assembly. It was supported by the Communists and the Socialists. It concentrated power in a unicameral Assembly and abolished the Senate of France. The Christian-Democrats campaigned for the "No" with de Gaulle and the opponents to a constitutional change (the classical Right and the Rally of the Republican Lefts dominated by the Radical Party).

The "No" coalition warned the voters against the danger of a "dictatorship" of an Assembly dominated by the Marxists, which could question the existence of private property. In the "Yes" coalition, the SFIO refused the Communist proposition of a common campaign. Finally, the "No"s won by 53% of the votes (May 1946 French constitutional referendum).

Consequently, a new National Assembly was elected in order to elaborate a new constitutional draft. The MRP, which led the "No" coalition, became the largest party with more votes and seats than the PCF. The Communists and the Socialists no longer formed a majority, so the MRP was a necessary partner for the writing of a constitutional text. Its leader Georges Bidault took the lead role in the provisional government.

Results

|-
! style="background-color:#E9E9E9;text-align:left;vertical-align:top;" colspan=2 |Parties and coalitions
! style="background-color:#E9E9E9;text-align:right;" | Abbr.
! style="background-color:#E9E9E9;text-align:right;" | Votes
! style="background-color:#E9E9E9;text-align:right;" | %
! style="background-color:#E9E9E9;text-align:right;" | Seats
|-
|style="background-color:"|
| style="text-align:left;" | Popular Republican Movement (Mouvement républicain populaire)
| style="text-align:right;" | MRP
| style="text-align:right;" | 5,589,213
| style="text-align:right;" | 28.22
| style="text-align:right;" | 166
|-
|style="background-color:"|
| style="text-align:left;" | French Communist Party (Parti communiste français)
| style="text-align:right;" | PCF
| style="text-align:right;" | 5,145,325
| style="text-align:right;" | 25.98
| style="text-align:right;" | 153
|-
|style="background-color:"|
| style="text-align:left;" | French Section of the Workers International (Section française de l'Internationale ouvrière)
| style="text-align:right;" | SFIO
| style="text-align:right;" | 4,187,747
| style="text-align:right;" | 21.14
| style="text-align:right;" | 128
|-
|
| style="text-align:left;" | Total "Three-parties alliance"
|
| style="text-align:right;" | 14,922,285
| style="text-align:right;" | 75.34
| style="text-align:right;" | 447
|-
|style="background-color:#1E90FF"|
| style="text-align:left;" | Moderates (Right-wing and UDMA) (Modérés)
| style="text-align:right;" | PRL/CNI
| style="text-align:right;" | 2,538,167
| style="text-align:right;" | 12.82
| style="text-align:right;" | 78
|-
|style="background-color:"|
| style="text-align:left;" | Rally of Republican Lefts (Rassemblement des gauches républicaines)
| style="text-align:right;" | RGR
| style="text-align:right;" | 2,299,963
| style="text-align:right;" | 11.61
| style="text-align:right;" | 52
|-
|
| style="text-align:left;" | Miscellaneous
|
| style="text-align:right;" | 44,915
| style="text-align:right;" | 0.23
| style="text-align:right;" | 9
|-
| colspan=2 style="text-align:left;" | Total
|
| style="text-align:right;" | 20,215,200
| style="text-align:right;" | 100
| style="text-align:right;" | 586
|-
| colspan=6 style="text-align:left;" | Abstention: 18.15%
|}

Parliamentary Groups 

1946-06
1946 elections in France